Dan Elkan (born September 7, 1978) is an American singer-songwriter and producer, who is best known as the singer and guitarist for the rock band Them Hills. Elkan has performed live with Broken Bells, Hella, and Kim Deal, and has appeared on recordings by Hella, Team Sleep, Norah Jones and Zach Hill.  Elkan produced Aaron Ross' 2007 album "Shapeshifter" and tracks for Golden Shoulders' "Get Reasonable" 2009. Elkan also co-produced Zach Hill & Holy Smokes' "Masculine Drugs" 2004 and Holy Smokes' "Talk to Your Kids about Gangs" 2006 as well as Alela Diane's 2009 album "To Be Still".

The Union (Western Nevada County, CA) in 2009 called him "instrumental in much of the music that has come out of Nevada County in the last 10 years".

Discography

With Pocket For Corduroy

 S/T EP (1998)
 As Soon As Impossible (2001)

With Hella

 Bitches Ain't Shit But Good People (2003)

With Golden Shoulders

 Friendship Is Deep (2004)
 Get Reasonable (2009)

With Zach Hill and Holy Smokes

 Masculine Drugs (2004)

With Team Sleep

 Team Sleep (2005)

With Daisy Spot

 Daisy Spot (album) (2005)

With Holy Smokes

 Talk To Your Kids About Gangs (2006)

With Aaron Ross

 Shapeshifter (2007)

With Them Hills

 Greener Grassing (2007)
 Process (2009)

With Zach Hill

 Astrological Straits (2009)

With Alela Diane

 To Be Still (2009)

With Norah Jones

 Little Broken Hearts (2012)

With Zavalaz

 All Those Nights We Never Met (2014)

With Pluralone

 To Be One With You (2019)

Tours

 Pocket For Corduroy (Vocals & Guitar, 2001)
 Hella (vocals, guitar, keyboard & sampler, 2005)
 Them Hills (vocals & guitar, 2006-2011)
 Broken Bells (vocals & guitar, 2010)
 Zavalaz (guitar & vocals, 2013)

References

External links
 AllMusic

Boken Bells Best song:Ghost inside and After the Disco

1978 births
Living people
American singer-songwriters
American male singer-songwriters
Hella (band) members
Team Sleep members
Broken Bells members
21st-century American singers
21st-century American male singers